Angélique de Rouillé (25 June 1756 – 4 February 1840) was a Belgian writer, remembered for her literary correspondence.

References

External links 

 

1756 births
1840 deaths
Belgian feminists
Belgian women writers
People from Ath